Kenneth F. Rennicks (born 1950) is an Irish former Gaelic football player and coach who played for club sides Bohermeen, Bohermeen-Martry and St Ultan's and at inter-county level with the Meath senior football team.

Career

Rennicks first came to prominence at club level with the Bohermeen juvenile team. He first lined out at inter-county level as a member of the Meath minor football team, before later earning selection for the under-21 and junior teams. Rennicks made his senior debut with Meath in October 1969. He won a Leinster Championship medal in his first full season before later lining out in the 1970 All-Ireland final defeat by Kerry. Rennicks claimed a National League title in 1975, while he also ended the season by being selected on the All-Star team. He also won a Railway Cup with Leinster. Rennicks ended his career at club level in 1981. He later became involved in team management and coaching and was a selector with the St Ultan's team that won the County Intermediate Championship title in 2008.

Honours

Meath
Leinster Senior Football Championship: 1970
National Football League: 1974-75

Leinster
Railway Cup: 1974

Awards
All-Star: 1975

References

1950 births
Living people
Gaelic football coaches
Gaelic football forwards
Gaelic football selectors
Leinster inter-provincial Gaelic footballers
Meath inter-county Gaelic footballers